Stadionul Municipal Dej is a multi-purpose stadium in Dej, Romania. It is currently used mostly for football matches and is the home ground of Unirea Dej.

External links
Stadionul Unirea at soccerway.com

Football venues in Romania
Dej
Buildings and structures in Cluj County